Exon Gustavo Vallecilla Godoy (born 28 May 1999) is an Ecuadorian professional footballer who plays as a centre-back for Major League Soccer club Colorado Rapids.

Career

Club career
Vallecilla left his home in Esmeraldas, Ecuador at the age of 15 to join Deportivo Cuenca. On 27 November 2016, he made his professional debut for Cuenca against Mushuc Runa S.C. in the Ecuadorian Serie A. In the following season, Vallecilla made one league appearance, while he in the 2018 season made 15.

In August 2018 it was reported, that S.D. Aucas had bought 50% of Vallecilla's pass for $80.000, and that he would join the club permanently from the 2019 season, with Cuenca still having a percentage of his pass. Joining Aucas for the 2019 season, Vallecilla only played 167 minutes in the whole season.

To get some more games, he was loaned out to Barcelona SC for the 2020 season with an option to buy. He made 15 league appearances for Barcelona, but however, the club decided not to trigger the option to make his stay permanent. Vallecilla then returned to Aucas for the 2021 season.

FC Cincinnati
On 5 April 2021, Vallecilla joined Major League Soccer club FC Cincinnati on loan for the 2021 season with an option to buy. He made his debut for the side on 16 May 2021 in their 3–2 home defeat against Inter Miami. The next match, on 22 May, Vallecilla scored his first goal for Cincinnati in their 2–1 victory over CF Montréal, scoring the equalizer in the 86nd minute. His second goal for Cincinnati came against the same opposition on 17 July in their 5–4 defeat at Saputo Stadium.

On 1 December 2021 Cincinnati confirmed, that they had triggered the buying option in Vallecilla’s contract, adding him to the squad for the 2022 season.

Colorado Rapids
On 28 March 2022, Colorado Rapids announced that they acquired Vallecilla for $800,000 with extra performance-based fees.

Career statistics

Honours
Barcelona SC
Ecuadorian Serie A: 2020

References

External links
 Profile at FC Cincinnati

Living people
1999 births
Association football defenders
Ecuadorian footballers
Ecuadorian expatriate footballers
Ecuador youth international footballers
Ecuador under-20 international footballers
People from Esmeraldas, Ecuador
Ecuadorian Serie A players
Major League Soccer players
C.D. Cuenca footballers
S.D. Aucas footballers
Barcelona S.C. footballers
FC Cincinnati players
Columbus Crew players
Colorado Rapids players
Expatriate soccer players in the United States
Ecuadorian expatriate sportspeople in the United States
Ecuador international footballers
Colorado Rapids 2 players
MLS Next Pro players